The Saint Constantine and Elena Cathedral is a cathedral in Bălți, Moldova.

History
The cornerstone was laid on September 24, 1924, by Bishop Visarion Puiu of Hotin with the future King Carol II of Romania, Patriarch Miron of Romania, Patriarch Damian of Jerusalem, Metropolitan Pimen Georgescu of Moldavia, and Metropolitan Gurie Grosu of Bessarabia. Between 1923 and 1935, Visarion Puiu was bishop of Hotin, his seat being in Bălți.

The cathedral was built in Neo-Romanian style. The consecration of the Saint Constantine and Elena Cathedral took place in Bălți on June 2, 1935. The Ecumenical Patriarch Patriarch Photios II of Constantinople was represented by the Metropolitan of Australia Timotheos Evangelinidis. The consecration ceremony was also attended by the King Carol II and son, future King Michael I of Romania .

The building survived the harsh treatment during the Soviet era almost without visible effects, when it was for most of the time a depot, later to be turned into the municipal museum.

Gallery

References

External links 

Catedrală Sfinţii împăraţi Constantin şi Elena

Buildings and structures in Bălți
Churches completed in 1934
20th-century Eastern Orthodox church buildings
Cathedrals in Moldova
1934 establishments in Romania
Neo-Brâncovenesc architecture